FC Eurocollege is a Bulgarian association football club based in Plovdiv, currently playing in the South-East Third League, the third level of Bulgarian football.

Current squad

References

External links
 Official website 

Eurocollege